The Royal Over-Seas League (ROSL) is a not-for-profit members' organisation with international headquarters in its clubhouse in central London, England. 

Founded by Sir Evelyn Wrench in 1910 as the Over-Seas Club, it was given a Royal Charter of Incorporation in 1922 and Queen Elizabeth II granted the title "Royal" to mark its golden jubilee in 1960. 

The league today is both an association of individual members and a supporter of Commonwealth art, music and welfare projects. The ROSL clubhouse in Edinburgh closed in January 2018, but ROSL continues to have a national and international presence from honorary representatives, a network of branches and reciprocal clubs in more than 100 countries.

Facilities and activities

Accommodation, dining and conference facilities are offered at the London clubhouses.

The league has an in-house magazine called Overseas, published quarterly, which comprises contemporary features written by renowned journalists, members' articles, news from regional branches, and information about forthcoming events.

Membership
There are 16,000 members worldwide at the various international branches. Membership fees are based on proximity to the London clubhouse, or age (under 30s enjoy a reduced rate of membership). Members who have held their membership for a period of 30 continuous years also pay a reduced subscription.

Music competition
ROSL organises an annual competition for musicians aged under 30. There are two ensemble awards and four solo awards, with the solo winners then competing for the Competition Gold Medal and First Prize. The Chairman of Adjudicators for the 2014 awards was Gavin Henderson. The Gold Medal competition was held at the Southbank Centre and it was won by saxophonist Huw Wiggin (Royal College of Music). The ensemble awards were won by Block4 (Royal College of Music) and the Solem Quartet (Royal Northern College of Music).

See also
List of London's gentlemen's clubs

References

External links
ROSL website – London
ROSL website – Edinburgh

Gentlemen's clubs in London
Patriotic societies
Commonwealth Family
International non-profit organizations
British Empire
Grade I listed buildings in the City of Westminster
Organizations established in 1910
Organisations based in the United Kingdom with royal patronage
St James's